To be is a copula: a word used to link the subject of a sentence with a predicate (a subject complement).
To Be may refer to:

To Be (album), a 1997 album by Karen Mok
To Be (short film), a 1990 short animation film by John Weldon
"To Be" (song), a 1999 song by Ayumi Hamasaki
"To Be", a song by Blue October from their 2013 album Sway

See also
Being (disambiguation)
"To be, or not to be", a quotation from Hamlet